John Alexander Matheson (1901–1950) was a Roman Catholic clergyman who served as the Bishop of Aberdeen from 1947 to 1950.

Born in Tomintoul, Moray on 28 April 1901, he was educated at St Mary's College, Blairs 1916-1919 and the Scots College, Rome 1919-1925. He was ordained a priest on 7 March 1925 in Rome and served his curacy in St Mary's Cathedral, Aberdeen 1925-1928. He was parish priest of Sacred Heart, Aberdeen 1928-1930; St Nathalan's, Ballater 1930-1943 and St Mary's, Dufftown 1943-1947.

He was appointed the Bishop of the Roman Catholic Diocese of Aberdeen by the Holy See on 2 August 1947, and consecrated to the Episcopate on 24 September 1947. The principal consecrator was Archbishop Andrew Thomas McDonald, and the principal co-consecrators were Bishop Kenneth Grant and Bishop (later Archbishop) James Donald Scanlan.

He died in office on 5 July 1950, aged 49, and was succeeded as Bishop of Aberdeen by Francis Walsh, with whom he had attended Fordyce Academy in their youth.

References 

1901 births
1950 deaths
Bishops of Aberdeen
People educated at Fordyce Academy
20th-century Roman Catholic bishops in Scotland
Scottish Roman Catholic bishops